The first USS Shamokin was a double-ended gunboat built during the American Civil War at Chester, Pennsylvania by Reaney, Son & Archbold.

Service history

Naval service
Shamokin was delivered to the Navy at the Philadelphia Navy Yard on 31 July 1865, and commissioned there on 17 October 1865, Comdr. Pierce Crosby in command.

Completed too late for service in the Civil War, Shamokin proceeded via New York City to the coast of Brazil. After three years of service in the South Atlantic Squadron, protecting American citizens and interests along the coast of South America, Shamokin returned home and was decommissioned and laid up at the Washington Navy Yard on 24 December 1868. She was sold there on 21 October 1869 to a Mr. T. Clyde.

Commercial service

After an extensive rebuild for commercial service, Shamokin was renamed Georgia. Georgia operated for nearly a decade before being wrecked off Costa Rica on 30 September 1878.

References
Notes

Bibliography
 
 Naval Historical Center Online Library of Selected Images: USS Shamokin
 Naval Historical Center Online Library of Selected Images: Steamship Georgia

 
 

 
Mohongo-class gunboats
1865 ships
Ships built by Reaney, Son & Archbold